Arthur Lanigan-O'Keeffe (born 13 September 1991) is an Irish athlete who competed at the 2012 Summer Olympics and 2016 Summer Olympics in the Modern pentathlon. In the 2016 Olympics he finished in 8th place running 11.12.23 for the final 3200 metre running and shooting segment. This time places him in the top 300 of Irish runners in 2016 in the 2 mile rankings.

References

External links 
 
 arthur_lok1 at Instagram

1991 births
Living people
Irish male modern pentathletes
Modern pentathletes at the 2012 Summer Olympics
Modern pentathletes at the 2016 Summer Olympics
Olympic modern pentathletes of Ireland
Sportspeople from County Kilkenny
People from Thomastown
Lanigan-O'Keeffe family